These are tables of congressional delegations from Louisiana to the United States House of Representatives and the United States Senate.

The current dean of the Louisiana delegation is Representative and House Majority Leader Steve Scalise (LA-1), having served in the House since 2008.

U.S. House of Representatives

Current members 
List of current members, their terms in office, district boundaries, and the district political ratings according to the CPVI. The delegation has 6 members, including 5 Republicans and 1 Democrat.

1806–1811: 1 non-voting delegate 
The first non-voting delegate took his seat on December 1, 1806, representing Orleans Territory's at-large congressional district.

1812–1823: 1 seat 
Statehood was achieved and a representative elected on April 30, 1812.

1823–1843: 3 seats 
Two more seats were apportioned following the 1820 census.

1843–1863: 4 seats 
A fourth seat was added following the 1840 census.

1863–1873: 5 seats 
A fifth seat was added following the 1860 census. However, the Civil War prevented them from being seated until July 18, 1868.

1873–1903: 6 seats 
A sixth seat was added following the 1870 census. From 1873 to 1875, that extra seat was elected at-large statewide. Starting in 1875, however, the state was redistricted into six districts.

1903–1913: 7 seats 
A seventh seat was added following the 1900 census.

1913–1993: 8 seats 
After the 1910 census, Louisiana's delegation reached its largest size, eight seats, which it held for 80 years.

1993–2013: 7 seats 
After the 1990 census, Louisiana lost one seat.

2013–present: 6 seats 
After the 2010 census, Louisiana lost one seat due to stagnant population growth and the loss of citizens who left the state after Hurricane Katrina and did not return.

United States Senate

Key

See also

List of United States congressional districts
Louisiana's congressional districts
Political party strength in Louisiana

References 

 
 
Louisiana
Politics of Louisiana
Congressional delegations
Congressional delegations